David Matthew Potts (March 12, 1906 – September 11, 1976) was a member of the United States House of Representatives from New York. Born in New York City, he attended the public schools and the College of the City of New York from 1927 to 1929. He graduated from Brooklyn Law School of St. Lawrence University in 1932, was admitted to the New York bar in 1933 and commenced practice in New York City. He was counsel to the New York Senate Committee on Affairs of the City of New York during the 1945 session, and was elected as a Republican to the Eightieth Congress, holding office from January 3, 1947, to January 3, 1949. He was an unsuccessful candidate for reelection in 1948 to the Eighty-first Congress and resumed the practice of law.

Potts was appointed surrogate of Bronx County by Governor Dewey and held that office from November 1951 to January 1953. He was a special referee of the Appellate Division, First Department, Supreme Court of State of New York during the June 1953 term and was a senior partner of Kadel, Wilson & Potts, until his death in 1976 in Bronxville. Interment was in Ferncliff Mausoleum, Hartsdale.

References

External links

1906 births
1976 deaths
City College of New York alumni
New York (state) lawyers
Brooklyn Law School alumni
Republican Party members of the United States House of Representatives from New York (state)
Burials at Ferncliff Cemetery
20th-century American lawyers
20th-century American politicians
Lawyers from New York City
Politicians from the Bronx